Jaisinagar is a town and a nagar panchayat in Sagar district in the Indian state of Madhya Pradesh.

Geography
Jaisinagar is located at 23°41'07.5"N 81°23'26.5"E. It has an average elevation of 593 metres (1,945 feet).

Demographics
 India census, Jaisinagar had a population of 7,392. Males constitute 52% of the population and females 48%. Jaisinghnagar has an average literacy rate of 57%, lower than the national average of 59.5%: male literacy is 65%, and female literacy is 48%. In Jaisinghnagar, 15% of the population is under 6 years of age.

References

Cities and towns in Shahdol district
Shahdol